Island Birds is an on-demand charter airline in the Caribbean. It was formed in the year 2000 and it is based in both the US Virgin Islands and the British Virgin Islands. The airline specializes in providing service from St Thomas (US Virgin Islands), San Juan (Puerto Rico), St Maarten and Antigua to Tortola, Virgin Gorda and Anegada in the British Virgin Islands. They are the only approved airline to provide completely unrestricted service into Virgin Gorda from the US and its territories (as approved by ASSI, the British Territory Aviation Regulators).

Fleet
2 Piper Chieftains -1 Piper Navajo-5 Piper Aztecs

Airlines of the British Virgin Islands